Vienna is a heritage-listed former house and now museum at 38-40 Alexandra Street, Hunters Hill in the Municipality of Hunter's Hill local government area of New South Wales, Australia. It was built during 1871 and is also known as Curan Curan, Carrum Carrum, Subiaco and Vienna Cottage. The property is owned by the National Trust of Australia (NSW). It was added to the New South Wales State Heritage Register on 2 April 1999.

History

Indigenous history

History of Hunters Hill
At the time of European contact the Kelly's bush area was inhabited by the Wal Umedegal Clan who spoke the Guringai language. They lived primarily on fish and shellfish, supplementing their diet when necessary with vegetables, marsupials, birds and grubs. They were also frequently observed firing the scrub both to facilitate access to the foreshore and to flush out game. Very little is known of their social structure and religious beliefs.

Captain John Hunter (1737-1821) of the Sirius, charted Sydney Harbour in 1788. On 28 January 1788 he wrote in his journal: "A few days after my arrival with the transports in Port Jackson, I set off with a six-oared boat and a small boat, intending to make as good a survey of the harbour as circumstances would admit:  I took to my assistance Mr Bradley, the first lieutenant, Mr Keltie, the master, and a young gentleman of the quarter-deck (midshipman Henry Waterhouse)." Hunter's meticulous chart shows 30 depth soundings around the peninsula bounded by the Parramatta and Lane Cove Rivers. Hunter was Governor of the Colony from 1795-1800. He is commemorated in the name of Hunters Hill.

In 1855 a speculative housing venture of erecting four prefabricated Swiss Cottages at Hunters Hill was underway. In this period Hunters Hill was an established French enclave, with the residence of the French consul located there at "Passy", and much of its early development was constructed by men of French descent. The prefabricated houses were advertised as "four splendid family residences, standing in their own grounds, of about 1 acres each", with "wood and water in abundance".

Beverley Sherry in her study of Hunter Hill notes that this was the first planned group of houses to be built in the municipality, marking the beginning of the garden suburb character of Australia's oldest garden suburb. The subdivision and garden suburb development occurred in the mid to late nineteenth century, predating the formation of the Garden Suburb movement. The historic development at Hunters Hill was consistently speculative, although some of the subdivisions were undertaken to provide residences for family members.

Vienna
Vienna was built in 1871 for John Jacob Hellman (later Hillman) and his Irish wife Ann. He originally came from Hamburg, Germany and his wife Ann (née O'Donnell) from Mooneenreave, County Leitrim, Ireland. Ann came to Australia in 1857 as a bounty migrant. They were married in 1860, and purchased what is now 36 to 40 Alexandra Street from Herman Heinrich Groth for A£60 on 19 November 1866. This land formed lots 11 and 12 of a Jules Joubert subdivision of 1859. The area was originally owned by John Roby Hatfield by crown grant dated 12 July 1839.

John Jacob Hellman was a shoemaker by occupation. In the 1870s he had a shop at 171/2 Erskine Street, City and later worked as a shoemaker to St. Joseph's College. He and his wife owned cattle and ran a dairy and orchard and in the early 1880s he was also the lamp lighter of the Borough of Hunter's Hill. There were six children, all except the first were baptised at the Villa Maria Church, Hunters Hill as Hillman, not Hellman. Their second son Hugh (born 8.7.1870) was enrolled as a boarder at St. Joseph's College on the first day (18.7.1881) that the College began at Hunter's Hill.

The cottage 'Redleaf (36 Alexandra Street) was also owned by the Hellmans and after the death of his wife Arm (5.8.1908), John Jacoh and his youngest son James Frederick (born 9.6.1873) moved in 1912 from Vienna into that weatherboard cottage. At that time his son Hugh was the owner occupier of Alroy (34 Alexandra Street) and his married daughter Mary King (born 19.8.1867) and her children lived in Vienna.

After the death of his father, James Frederick, who was a tailor by occupation, became the owner of both Vienna and Redleaf and continued to live in Redleaf until 1923. During the 1920s he made some changes to Vienna including the insertion of side windows to allow more light into the rooms. Mary King left Vienna in 1923 and another of John Jacob's sons, John Hillman (born 15.5.1865) lived there until 1926. A number of tenants then occupied the cottage, the Anderson family since 1941, George Anderson being the tenant in 1983. James Frederick never married and after his death in 1958 the cottage passed to one of his nieces, Gladys Hillman who is still the owner.

Vienna was known from its construction in 1871 up until the 1920s as Carrum Carrum. When occupied by John Hillman Jnr. in 1924 it was called Subiaco but since the 1930s its name has been Vienna.

The adjoining land (40 Alexandra Street), being part of Lot 12 of the original Joubert subdivision of 1859, has never been built upon. It was for many years an orchard having a variety of trees bearing oranges, mandarins, lemons, plums, quinces, pomegranates and guavas. The land has always been an integral part of Vienna. It also contains the old well which is now covered over.

In 1984 Vienna Cottage was purchased by the National Trust of Australia (NSW) with funding from the local Vienna Appeal Committee.

Description 
Vienna is a four-roomed stone gabled roofed cottage with front and back verandahs on a rectangular suburban block with small front garden and long rear garden, with remnant orchard.

The adjoining land (40 Alexandra Street), being part of Lot 12 of the original Joubert subdivision of 1859, has never been built upon. It was for many years an orchard having a variety of trees bearing oranges, mandarins, lemons, plums, quinces, pomegranates and guavas. The land has always been an integral part of Vienna. It also contains the old well which is now covered over.

The roof is slated and the doors are four panelled. The shuttered windows at the front of the house are plate glass while those at the back are small paned with crown glass. The house retains its early Victorian style timber chimneypieces and in the front rooms are pretty circular ceiling roses, which is the only elaboration of the plasterwork.

Behind the house is a weatherboard service block, with an iron roof and stone chimney. This is linked to the main house by a simple covered way across a narrow flagged court.

Condition 

As at 3 March 2000, the physical condition was good.

Modifications and dates 
1920s - windows put in side walls to allow more light into the rooms.
2007-8: garden restoration completed, including ornaments, pots, implements, fence repair, installing new gate and security device.

Heritage listing 
As at 2 January 2013, Vienna was an excellent example of a tradesman's cottage of the nineteenth century, complete with its detached kitchen block. It intactness makes it rare in Sydney. It is evidence of the period 1861 - 1890 when Hunter's Hill first developed as a suburb and it stands on the earliest successful small lot subdivision in the village. The subdivision was undertaken by Jules Joubert who with his brother Didier were together the first, and most prominent developers of Hunter's Hill. The cottage demonstrates the tradesman's way of life of the 19th century, and how the family adapted the cottage to accommodate changing needs and standards.

Vienna was listed on the New South Wales State Heritage Register on 2 April 1999 having satisfied the following criteria.

The place is important in demonstrating the course, or pattern, of cultural or natural history in New South Wales.

Vienna is an excellent example of a tradesman's cottage of the nineteenth century, complete with its detached kitchen block. It is evidence of the period 1861 - 1890 when Hunter's Hill first developed as a suburb and it stands on the earliest successful small lot subdivision in the village. The subdivision was undertaken by Jules Joubert who with his brother Didier were together the first, and most prominent developers of Hunter's Hill. The cottage demonstrates the tradesman's way of life of the 19th century, and how the family adapted the cottage to accommodate changing needs and standards.

The place is important in demonstrating aesthetic characteristics and/or a high degree of creative or technical achievement in New South Wales.

The un-built upon land, once an orchard, is rare evidence of the reliance of suburban families in the 19th and early 20th century on home produce, and is a significant feature of the property.

The place has a strong or special association with a particular community or cultural group in New South Wales for social, cultural or spiritual reasons.

Vienna combined with the adjoining Hillman cottages of Alroy and Redleaf demonstrate the once common pattern of family property ownership, and the later subdivision of the land demonstrates, in microcosm, the speculative nature of land ownership in Hunter's Hill.

The place has potential to yield information that will contribute to an understanding of the cultural or natural history of New South Wales.

The cottage has considerable educational value. The cottage demonstrates the tradesman's way of life of the 19th century, and how the family adapted the cottage to accommodate changing needs and standards.

The place possesses uncommon, rare or endangered aspects of the cultural or natural history of New South Wales.

Its intactness makes it rare in Sydney.

See also 

Australian residential architectural styles

References

Bibliography

Attribution

External links

New South Wales State Heritage Register
Hunters Hill, New South Wales
Houses in Sydney
Museums in Sydney
Articles incorporating text from the New South Wales State Heritage Register
1871 establishments in Australia
Houses completed in 1871
Historic house museums in New South Wales